Marco César Jaime Jr. (born 20 January 1995) is a former professional footballer player who played as a defender. Born in the United States, he has previously represented the Mexico national under-20 team.

Career 
Jaime Jr. began his career with Toluca, before signing with USL Championship club Las Vegas Lights ahead of their inaugural 2018 season.

Career statistics 

Notes

References

External links 
 

1995 births
Living people
American soccer players
Mexican footballers
Association football defenders
Deportivo Toluca F.C. players
Deportivo Toluca F.C. Premier players
Gavilanes de Matamoros footballers
Las Vegas Lights FC players
Coras de Nayarit F.C. footballers
Liga Premier de México players
USL Championship players
Soccer players from Las Vegas
American sportspeople of Mexican descent